Tomasz Wisio (born 20 January 1982) is a Polish former professional footballer who played as a defender.

References

External links
 
 
 Guardian Football

1982 births
Living people
Polish footballers
Polish expatriate footballers
Wisła Kraków players
SK Austria Kärnten players
LASK players
Arminia Bielefeld players
Xanthi F.C. players
Ergotelis F.C. players
RB Leipzig players
SKN St. Pölten players
GKS Katowice players
Austrian Football Bundesliga players
Super League Greece players
Expatriate footballers in Germany
Expatriate footballers in Greece
Expatriate footballers in Austria
Polish expatriate sportspeople in Germany
Polish expatriate sportspeople in Greece
Polish expatriate sportspeople in Austria
People from Lubin
Sportspeople from Lower Silesian Voivodeship
Association football defenders